Athyrma adjutrix is a species of moth in the family Erebidae. It is found in North America and South America.

The MONA or Hodges number for Athyrma adjutrix is 8583.

References

Further reading

 
 
 

Eulepidotinae
Articles created by Qbugbot
Moths described in 1780